Illmatic is the debut studio album by American rapper Nas. It was released on April 19, 1994, by Columbia Records. After signing with the label with the help of MC Serch, Nas recorded the album in 1992 and 1993 at Chung King Studios, D&D Recording, Battery Studios, and Unique Recording Studios in New York City. The album's production was handled by DJ Premier, Large Professor, Pete Rock, Q-Tip, L.E.S., and Nas himself. Styled as a hardcore hip hop album, Illmatic features multi-syllabic internal rhymes and inner-city narratives based on Nas' experiences growing up in the Queensbridge Houses in Queens, New York City.

The album debuted at number 12 on the US Billboard 200 chart, selling 63,000 copies in its first week. However, its initial sales fell below expectations and its five singles failed to achieve significant chart success. Despite the album's low initial sales, Illmatic received rave reviews from most music critics, who praised its production and Nas' lyricism. On January 17, 1996, the album was certified gold by the Recording Industry Association of America, and on December 11, 2001, it earned a platinum certification after shipping 1,000,000 copies in the United States. As of February 6, 2019, the album had sold 2 million copies in the United States.

Since its initial reception, Illmatic has been recognized by writers and music critics as a landmark album in East Coast hip hop. Its influence on subsequent hip hop artists has been attributed to the album's production and Nas' lyricism. It also contributed to the revival of the New York City rap scene, introducing a number of stylistic trends to the region. The album is widely regarded as one of the greatest and most influential hip hop albums of all time, appearing on numerous best album lists by critics and publications. Billboard wrote in 2015 that "Illmatic is widely seen as the best hip-hop album ever". In 2020, the album was ranked by Rolling Stone at number 44 on its list of The 500 Greatest Albums of All Time, and in 2021, it was selected by the Library of Congress for preservation in the National Recording Registry for being "culturally, historically, or aesthetically significant".

Background 
As a teenager, Nas wanted to pursue a career as a rapper and enlisted his best friend and neighbor, Willy "Ill Will" Graham, as his DJ. Nas initially went by the nickname "Kid Wave" before adopting the alias "Nasty Nas". At the age of fifteen, he met producer Large Professor from Flushing, Queens, who introduced him to his group Main Source. Nas made his recorded debut with them on the opening verse on "Live at the Barbeque" from their 1991 album Breaking Atoms. Nas subsequently made his solo debut on his 1992 single "Halftime" for the soundtrack to the film Zebrahead. The single added to the buzz surrounding Nas, earning him comparisons to the highly influential golden age rapper Rakim. Despite his buzz in the underground scene, Nas did not receive an offer for a recording contract and was rejected by major rap labels such as Cold Chillin' and Def Jam Recordings. Nas and Ill Will continued to work together, but their partnership was cut short when Graham was murdered by a gunman in Queensbridge on May 23, 1992; Nas' brother was also shot that night, but survived. Nas has cited that moment as a "wake-up call" for him.

In mid-1992, MC Serch, whose group 3rd Bass had dissolved, began working on a solo project and approached Nas. At the suggestion of producer T-Ray, Serch collaborated with Nas for "Back to the Grill", the lead single for Serch's 1992 solo debut album Return of the Product. At the recording session for the song, Serch discovered that Nas did not have a recording contract and subsequently contacted Faith Newman, an A&R executive at Sony Music Entertainment. As Serch recounted, "Nas was in a position where his demo had been sittin' around, 'Live at the Barbeque' was already a classic, and he was just tryin' to find a decent deal ... So when he gave me his demo, I shopped it around. I took it to Russell first, Russell said it sounded like G Rap, he wasn't wit' it. So I took it to Faith. Faith loved it, she said she'd been looking for Nas for a year and a half. They wouldn't let me leave the office without a deal on the table."

Once MC Serch assumed the role of executive producer for Nas' debut project, he attempted to connect Nas with various producers. Numerous New York-based producers were eager to work with the up-and-coming rapper and went to Power House Studios with Nas. Among those producers was DJ Premier, recognized at the time for his raw and aggressive jazz sample-based production and heavy scratching, and for his work with rapper Guru as a part of hip hop duo Gang Starr. After his production on Lord Finesse & DJ Mike Smooth's Funky Technician (1990) and Jeru the Damaja's The Sun Rises in the East (1994), Premier began recording exclusively at D&D Studios in New York City, before working with Nas on Illmatic.

Recording 

Prior to recording, DJ Premier listened to Nas' debut single, and later stated "When I heard 'Halftime', that was some next shit to me. That's just as classic to me as 'Eric B For President' and 'The Bridge'. It just had that type of effect. As simple as it is, all of the elements are there. So from that point, after Serch approached me about doing some cuts, it was automatic. You'd be stupid to pass that up even if it wasn't payin' no money." Serch later noted the chemistry between Nas and DJ Premier, recounting that "Primo and Nas, they could have been separated at birth. It wasn't a situation where his beats fit their rhymes, they fit each other." While Serch reached out to DJ Premier, Large Professor contacted Pete Rock to collaborate with Nas on what became "The World Is Yours". Shortly afterwards, L.E.S. (a DJ in Nas's Queensbridge neighborhood) and A Tribe Called Quest's Q-Tip and chose to work on the album. "Life's a Bitch" contains a cornet solo performed by Nas' father, Olu Dara. The song also features Brooklyn-based rapper AZ.

In an early promotional interview, Nas claimed that the name "Illmatic" (meaning "beyond ill" or "the ultimate") was a reference to his incarcerated friend, Illmatic Ice. Nas later described the title name as "supreme ill. It's as ill as ill gets. That shit is a science of everything ill." At the time of its recording, expectations in the hip hop scene were high for Illmatic. In a 1994 interview for The Source, which dubbed him "the second coming" (referring to Rakim), Nas spoke highly of the album, saying that "this feels like a big project that's gonna affect the world [...] We in here on the down low [...] doing something for the world. That's how it feels, that's what it is. For all the ones that think it's all about some ruff shit, talkin' about guns all the time, but no science behind it, we gonna bring it to them like this." AZ recounted recording on the album, "I got on Nas' album and did the 'Life's a Bitch' song, but even then I thought I was terrible on it, to be honest. But once people started hearing that and liking it, that's what built my confidence. I thought, 'OK, I can probably do this.' That record was everything. To be the only person featured on Illmatic when Nas is considered one of the top men in New York at that time, one of the freshest new artists, that was big." During the sessions, Nas composed the song "Nas Is Like", which he later recorded as a single for his 1999 album I Am….

Concerning the recording of the album's opening song "N.Y. State of Mind", producer DJ Premier later said "When we did 'N.Y. State of Mind,' at the beginning when he says, 'Straight out the dungeons of rap / Where fake niggas don't make it back,' then you hear him say, 'I don't know how to start this shit,' 'cause he had just written it. He's got the beat running in the studio, but he doesn't know how he's going to format how he's going to convey it. So he's going, 'I don't know how to start this shit,' and I'm counting him in [to begin his verse]. One, two, three. And then you can hear him go, 'Yo,' and then he goes right into it."

Themes 

Illmatic contains highly discerning treatment of its subject matter: gang rivalries, desolation, and the ravages of urban poverty. Nas, who was twenty years old when the album was released, focuses on depicting his own experiences, creating highly detailed first-person narratives that deconstruct the troubled life of an inner city teenager. Jeff Weiss of Pitchfork describes the theme of the album as a “[S]tory of a gifted writer born into squalor, trying to claw his way out of the trap. It's somewhere between The Basketball Diaries and Native Son ...” The narratives featured in Illmatic originate from Nas' own experiences as an adolescent growing up in the Queensbridge housing projects located in the Long Island City-section of Queens. Nas said in an interview in 2001: “When I made Illmatic I was a little kid in Queensbridge trapped in the ghetto. My soul was trapped in Queensbridge projects.” In a 2012 interview, he explained his inspiration for exploring this subject matter:

Nas's depictions of project life alternate from moments of pain and pleasure to frustration and braggadocio. The columnist for OhWord.com wrote: "[His] narrative voice swerves between personas that are cynical and optimistic, naïve and world-weary, enraged and serene, globally conscious and provincial". Jeff Weiss describes the "enduring image" often associated with Nas' narrated stream of consciousness: "[A] baby-faced Buddha monk in public housing, scribbling lotto dreams and grim reaper nightmares in dollar notebooks, words enjambed in the margins. The only light is the orange glow of a blunt, bodega liquor, and the adolescent rush of first creation. Sometimes his pen taps the paper and his brain blanks. In the next sentence, he remembers dark streets and the noose." Critic and blogger Kenny Waste comments on the significance of Queensbridge as a setting in Illmatic, writing, “The songs are made up largely of recollections or Nas describing his emotions, which range from feeling trapped to overt optimism about his abilities to escape the 'hands of doom'. But they always remain within the walls of his Queensbridge home.”

Along with its narratives, Illmatic is also distinct for its many portrayals and descriptions of places, people, and interactions. In his songs, Nas often depicts the corners and boulevards of Queensbridge, while mentioning the names of streets, friends, local crews and drug dealers, and utilizing vernacular slang indigenous to his hometown. Poet and author Kevin Coval describes this approach to songwriting as that of a “hip-hop poet-reporter...rooted in the intimate specificity of locale.” Commenting on Nas' use of narrative, Sohail Daulatzai, Professor of Film and Media Studies at University of Southern California, compares the album to cinema, citing its "detailed descriptions, dense reportage, and visually stunning rhymes..." In Born to Use Mics: Reading Nas's Illmatic, he writes: "Like the 1965 landmark masterpiece film The Battle of Algiers, which captured the Algerian resistance against French colonialism, Illmatic brilliantly blurred the lines between fiction and documentary, creating a heightened sense of realism and visceral eloquence for Nas' renegade first-person narratives and character-driven odes.”

Drug violence 
Many of the themes found in Illmatic revolve around Nas' experience living in an environment where poverty, violence, and drug use abound. Throughout the 1980s and early 1990s, residents of Queensbridge experienced intense violence, as the housing development was overrun by the crack epidemic. Illmatic contains imagery inspired by this prevalence of street crime. In "N.Y. State of Mind", Nas details the trap doors, rooftop snipers, street corner lookouts, and drug dealers that pervade his urban dreamscape. Sohail Daulatzai describes this language as "chilling" and suggests that it “harrowingly describes and imagines with such surreal imagery, with so much noir discontent and even more fuck-you ambition, the fragile and tenuous lives of ghetto dwellers…” Author Adam Mansbach interprets Nas' violent aesthetics as a metaphoric device meant to authenticate the rough edges of his persona: "Nas's world and worldview are criminal and criminalized. Hence, he uses metaphoric violence as a central trope of his poetic." Writer and musician Gregory Tate regards this violent imagery as part of a trend towards dark subject matter that came to prevail among East Coast rappers in the hardcore hip hop scene. He writes, “[S]ome of the most memorably dark, depressive but flowing lyrics in hip hop history were written by Nas, Biggie, and members of the Wu-Tang Clan on the death knell of the crack trade."

Other writers, such as Mark Anthony Neal, have described these lyrical themes as a form of “brooding introspection”, disclosing the tortured dimensions of drug crime and its impressions on an adolescent Nas. Sam Chennault wrote, "Nas captures post-crack N.Y.C. in all its ruinous glory ... [r]ealizing that drugs were both empowering and destructive, his lyrics alternately embrace and reject the idea of ghetto glamour". According to Steve Juon of RapReviews.com, Nas "illustrates the Queensbridge trife life of his existence, while at the same time providing hope that there is something greater than money, guns and drugs." Richard Harrington of The Washington Post described Nas' coming-of-age experience as "balancing limitations and possibilities, distinguishing hurdles and springboards, and acknowledging his own growth from roughneck adolescent to a maturing adult who can respect and criticize the culture of violence that surrounds him.

Artistic credibility 
The content of Illmatic is also informed by notions of artistic authenticity. The promotional press sheet that accompanied the album's release implied Nas' refusal to conform to commercial trends, stating: “While it's sad that there's so much frontin' in the rap world today, this should only make us sit up and pay attention when a rapper comes along who's not about milking the latest trend and running off with the loot.” At the time of the album's release, the hip hop community was embroiled in a debate about artistic authenticity and commercialism in popular music. Chicago rapper Common describes in the preface to Born to Use Mics: Reading Nas's Illmatic the concerns that were felt by him and his contemporaries: “It was that serious for so many of us. We didn't just grow up with hip hop; we grew up with hip hop as hip hop was also growing, and so that made for a very close and intimate relationship that was becoming more and more urgent – and we felt it. Our art was being challenged in many ways as the moneymen began to sink their teeth into us.”

In the context of this debate, music writers have interpreted Illmatic as an admonishment for hip hop purists and practitioners. In the opening track, "The Genesis", Nas bemoans the lack of legitimacy among other MCs in the projects, insisting that he has "Been doin' this shit since back then." Citing songs such as “Life's a Bitch”, Guthrie Ramsay Jr. argues that Nas “set a benchmark for rappers in an artistic field consumed by constantly shifting notions of 'realness', authenticity, and artistic credibility." Sohail Daulatzai writes: "Though Illmatic was highly anticipated release, far from under the radar, Nas's taking it back to 'the dungeons of rap' was…a kind of exorcism or purging ('where fake niggas don't make it back') that was at the very least trying to claim a different aesthetic of resistance and rebellion that was all too aware of hip-hop's newfound mainstream potential."

Musical endowment 
In addition to its lyrical content, many writers have commented on the thematic significance of Illmatics musical endowments. “Drawing on everything from old school hip hop, to blues, to fairly avant-garde jazz compositions,” writes music blogger Kenny Waste, “the sampling choices within Illmatic reflect an individual with not only a deep appreciation for but also a deep knowledge of music.”
Musicologist and pianist Guthrie Ramsay Jr. describes Illmatic as "an artistic emblem" that "anchors itself in the moment while reminding us that powerful musical statements often select past material and knowledge for use in the present and hope for the future." Kevin Coval considers the sampling of artists Craig G and Biz Markie in 'Memory Lane' as an attempt to build upon the hip hop tradition of Queens, most notably the Juice Crew All Stars. These samples are intended to serve as tributes to “Nas' lyrical  and around-the-way influences. He is repping his borough's hip hop canon.” The involvement of older artists, including Nas' father, has also been cited as a formative influence in the making of Illmatic. Author Adam Mansbach argues, “It's the presence of all these benevolent elders –his father and the cadre of big brother producers steering the album – that empowers Nas to rest comfortably in his identity as an artist and an inheritor of tradition, and thus find the space to innovate.”

Music writers have also characterized the album's contents as a commentary on hip hop's evolution. As Princeton University professor Imani Perry writes, Illmatic “embodies the entire story of hip-hop, bearing all of its features and gifts. Nas has the raw lyrics of old schoolers, the expert deejaying and artful lyricism of the 1980s, the slice of hood life, and the mythic ... The history of hip-hop up to 1994 is embodied in Illmatic.” In the song, "Represent", Nas alludes to the Juice Crew's conflict with Boogie Down Productions, which arose as a dispute over the purported origins of hip hop. Princeton University professor Eddie S. Glaude Jr. claims that this "situates Queensbridge and himself within the formative history of hip-hop culture." The opening skit, 'The Genesis,' also contains an audio sample of the 1983 film, Wild Style, which showcased the work of early hip hop pioneers such as Grandmaster Flash, Fab Five Freddy, and the Rock Steady Crew. After the music of Wild Style is unwittingly rejected by one of his peers, Nas admonishes his friend about the importance of their musical roots. Kenny Waste suggests that embedded deep within this track "is a complex and subtle exposition on the themes of Illmatic.” Similarly, Professor Adilifu Nama of California State University Northridge writes, “'[T]he use of Wild Style...goes beyond a simple tactic to imbue Illmatic with an aura of old-school authenticity. The sonic vignette comments on the collective memory of the hip hop community and its real, remembered, and even imagined beginning, as well as the pitfalls of assimilation, the importance of history, and the passing of hip-hop's 'age of innocence'.”

Lyricism 
Illmatic has been noted by music writers for Nas' unique style of delivery and poetic substance. His lyrics contain layered rhythms, multisyllabic rhymes, internal half rhymes, assonance, and enjambment. Music critic Marc Lamont Hill of PopMatters elaborates on Nas' lyricism and delivery throughout the album, stating "Nas' complex rhyme patterns, clever wordplay, and impressive vocab took the art [of rapping] to previously unprecedented heights. Building on the pioneering work of Kool G Rap, Big Daddy Kane, and Rakim, tracks like 'Halftime' and the laid back 'One Time 4 Your Mind' demonstrated a [high] level of technical precision and rhetorical dexterity." Hill cites "Memory Lane (Sittin' in da Park)" as "an exemplar of flawless lyricism", while critic Steve Juon wrote that the lyrics of the album's last song, "It Ain't Hard to Tell", are "just as quotable if not more-so than anything else on the LP – what album could end on a higher note than this?":

Focusing on poetic forms found in his lyrics, Princeton University professor Imani Perry describes Nas' performance as that of a "poet-musician" indebted to the conventions of jazz poetry. She suggests that Nas' lyricism might have been shaped by the "black art poetry album genre," pioneered by Gil Scott-Heron, The Last Poets, and Nikki Giovanni. Chicago-based poet and music critic Kevin Coval attributes Nas' lyricism to his unique approach to rapping, which he describes as a  "fresh-out-the-rhyme-book presentation": "It's as if Nas, the poet, reporter, brings his notebook into the studio, hears the beat, and weaves his portraits on top with ill precision." Coval also comments on the rapper's vignettes of inner-city life, which are depicted using elaborate rhyme structures: "All the words, faces and bodies of an abandoned post-industrial, urban dystopia are framed in Nas's tightly packed stanzas. These portraits of his brain and community in handcuffs are beautiful, brutal and extremely complex, and they lend themselves to the complex and brilliantly compounded rhyme schemes he employs."

Production 

Illmatic also garnered praise for its production. According to critics, the album's five major producers (Large Professor, DJ Premier, Pete Rock, Q-Tip and L.E.S.) extensively contributed to the cohesive atmospheric aesthetic that permeated the album, while still retaining each's individual, trademark sound.' For instance, DJ Premier's production on the album is noted by critics for his minimalist style, which featured simple loops over heavy beats. Charles Aaron of Spin wrote of the producers' contributions, "nudging him toward Rakim-like-rumination, they offer subdued, slightly downcast beats, which in hip hop today means jazz, primarily of the '70s keyboard-vibe variety". Q magazine noted that "the musical backdrops are razor sharp; hard beats but with melodic hooks and loops, atmospheric background piano, strings or muted trumpet, and samples ... A potent treat." One music critic wrote that "Illmatic is laced with some of the finest beats this side of In Control Volume 1".

The majority of the album consists of vintage funk, soul, and jazz samples. Commenting on the album and its use of samples, Pitchforks Jeff Weiss claims that both Nas and his producers found inspiration for the album's production through the music of their childhood: "The loops rummage through their parent's collection: Donald Byrd, Joe Chambers, Ahmad Jamal, Parliament, Michael Jackson. Nas invites his rolling stone father, Olu Dara to blow the trumpet coda on "Life's a Bitch". Jazz rap fusion had been done well prior, but rarely with such subtlety. Nas didn't need to make the connection explicit—he allowed you to understand what jazz was like the first time your parents and grandparents heard it." Similarly, journalist Ben Yew comments on the album's nostalgic sounds, "The production, accentuated by infectious organ loop[s], vocal sample[s], and synthesizer-like pads in the background, places your mind in a cheerful, reminiscent, mood."

Songs 

The intro, "The Genesis", is composed as an aural montage that begins with the sound of an elevated train and an almost-inaudible voice rhyming beneath it. Over these sounds are two men arguing. It samples Grand Wizard Theodore's "Subway Theme" from the 1983 film Wild Style, the first major hip hop motion picture. Nas made another ode to Wild Style, while shooting the music video for his single, "It Ain't Hard to Tell", on the same stage as the final scene for the film. His verse on "Live at the Barbeque" is played in the background of "The Genesis". According to music writer Mickey Hess, in the intro, "Nas tells us everything he wants us to know about him. The train is shorthand for New York; the barely discernible rap is, in fact, his "Live at the Barbeque" verse; and the dialogue comes from Wild Style, one of the earliest movies to focus on hip hop culture. Each of these is a point of genesis. New York for Nas as a person, 'Live at the Barbeque' for Nas the rapper, and Wild Style, symbolically at least, for hip hop itself. These are my roots, Nas was saying, and he proceeded to demonstrate exactly what those roots had yielded."

Setting the general grimy, yet melodic, tone of the album, "N.Y. State of Mind" features a dark, jazzy piano sample courtesy of DJ Premier. It opens with high-pitched guitar notes looped from jazz and funk musician Donald Byrd's "Flight Time" (1972), while the prominent groove of piano notes was sampled from the Joe Chambers composition "Mind Rain" (1978). The lyrics of "N.Y. State of Mind" have Nas recounting his participation in gang violence and philosophizing that "Life is parallel to Hell, but I must maintain", while his rapping spans over forty bars. "N.Y. State of Mind" focuses on a mindstate that a person obtains from living in Nas' impoverished environment. Critic Marc Hill of PopMatters wrote that the song "provides as clear a depiction of ghetto life as a Gordon Parks photograph or a Langston Hughes poem."

In other songs on Illmatic, Nas celebrates life's pleasures and achievements, acknowledging violence as a feature of his socio-economic conditions rather than the focus of his life. "Life's a Bitch" contains a sample of The Gap Band's hit "Yearning for Your Love" (1980), and has guest vocals from East New York-based rapper AZ. It also features Nas's father, Olu Dara, playing a trumpet solo as the music fades out. A columnist for OhWord.com wrote that Dara's contribution to the song provides a "beautifully wistful end to a track that feels drenched in the dying rays of a crimson sunset over the city." "The World Is Yours" provides a more optimistic narrative from Nas' viewpoint, as he cites political and spiritual leader Gandhi as an influence in its verse, in contrast to the previous Scarface references of "N.Y. State of Mind". While citing "Life's a Bitch" as "possibly the saddest hip-hop song ever recorded", Rhapsody's Sam Chennault wrote that "The World Is Yours" "finds optimism in the darkest urban crevices". "The World Is Yours" was named the seventh greatest rap song by About.com.

The nostalgic "Memory Lane (Sittin' in da Park)" contains a Reuben Wilson sample, which comprises the sound of a Hammond organ, guitar, vocals and percussion, and adds to the track's ghostly harmonies. Spence D. of IGN wrote that the lyrics evoke "the crossroads of old school hip hop and new school." "One Love" is composed of a series of letters to incarcerated friends, recounting mutual acquaintances and events that have occurred since the receiver's imprisonment, and address unfaithful girlfriends, emotionally tortured mothers, and underdog loyalty. The phrase "one love" signifies street loyalty in the song. After delivering "shout-outs to locked down comrades", Nas chastises a youth who seems destined for prison in the final verse, "Shorty's laugh was cold blooded as he spoke so foul/Only twelve tryin' to tell me that he liked my style [...] Words of wisdom from Nas, try to rise up above/Keep an eye out for Jake, shorty-wop, one love". Produced by Q-Tip, "One Love" samples the double bass and piano from the Heath Brothers' "Smilin' Billy Suite Part II" (1975) and the drum break from Parliament's "Come In Out the Rain" (1970), complementing the track's mystical and hypnotic soundscape.

"One Time 4 Your Mind" features battle rap braggadocio by Nas. With a similar vibe as "N.Y. State of Mind", the rhythmic "Represent" has a serious tone, exemplified by Nas' opening lines, "Straight up shit is real and any day could be your last in the jungle/get murdered on the humble, guns will blast and niggaz tumble". While the majority of the album consists of funk, soul and jazz samples, "Represent" contains a sample of "Thief of Bagdad" by organist Lee Erwin from the 1924 film of the same name. Nas discusses his lifestyle in an environment where he "loves committin' sins" and "life ain't shit, but stress, fake niggas and crab stunts", while describing himself as "The brutalizer, crew de-sizer, accelerator/The type of nigga who be pissin' in your elevator". "It Ain't Hard to Tell" is a braggadocio rap: "Vocals'll squeeze glocks, MC's eavesdrop/Though they need not to sneak/My poetry's deep, I never fail/Nas's raps should be locked in a cell". It opens with guitars and synths of Michael Jackson's "Human Nature" (1983); the song's vocals are sampled for the intro and chorus sections, creating a swirling mix of horns and tweaked-out voices. Large Professor looped in drum samples from Stanley Clarke's "Slow Dance" (1978) and saxophone from Kool & the Gang's "N.T." (1971).

Artwork 

On the vinyl and cassette pressings of Illmatic, the traditional side A and side B division are replaced with "40th Side North" and “41st Side South,” respectively – the main streets that form the geographic boundaries that divide the Queensbridge housing projects. Professor Sohail Daulatzai views this labeling as significant, since it transforms Illmatic into "a sonic map." The album serves as the legend for Nas's ghetto cartography, as he narrates his experiences and those who live in the Queensbridge”  In a 2009 interview with XXL magazine, Nas discussed the purpose behind the album artwork among other promotional efforts, stating "Really the record had to represent everything Nasir Jones is about from beginning to end, from my album cover to my videos. My record company had to beg me to stop filmin' music videos in the projects. No matter what the song was about I had 'em out there. That's what it was all about for me, being that kid from the projects, being a poster child for that, that didn't exist back then."

Album cover 
The album cover of Illmatic features a picture of Nas as a child, which was taken after his father, Olu Dara, returned home from an overseas tour. The original cover was intended to have a picture of Nas holding Jesus Christ in a headlock, reflecting the religious imagery of Nas' rap on "Live at the Barbeque"; "When I was 12, I went to hell for snuffing Jesus".

The accepted cover, designed by Aimee Macauley, features a photo of Nas as a child superimposed over a backdrop of a city block, taken by Danny Clinch. In a 1994 interview, Nas discussed the concept behind the photo of him at age 7, stating "That was the year I started to acknowledge everything [around me]. That's the year everything set off. That's the year I started seeing the future for myself and doing what was right. The ghetto makes you think. The world is ours. I used to think I couldn't leave my projects. I used to think if I left, if anything happened to me, I thought it would be no justice or I would be just a dead slave or something. The projects used to be my world until I educated myself to see there's more out there." According to Ego Trip, the cover of Illmatic is "reputedly" believed to have been inspired by a jazz album, Howard Hanger Trio's A Child Is Born (1974) — whose cover also features a photograph of a child, superimposed on an urban landscape. Nas has revealed that the inspiration for the album cover was derived from Michael Jackson. “I’m a big Michael Jackson fan,” Nas has stated. “I’ll tell you something I never said. On my album cover, you see me with the afro, that was kind of inspired by Michael Jackson – the little kid picture.”

Since its release, the cover art of Illmatic has also gained an iconic reputation — having been subject to numerous parodies and tributes. Music columnist Byron Crawford later called the cover for Illmatic "one of the dopest album covers ever in hip-hop." Commenting on the cover's artistic value, Rob Marriott of Complex writes, "Illmatic's poignant cover matched the mood, tone, and qualities of this introspective album to such a high degree that it became an instant classic, hailed as a visual full of meaning and nuance." XXL called the album cover a "high art photo concept for a rap album" and described the artwork as a "noisy, confusing streetscape looking through the housing projects and a young boy superimposed in the center of it all." The XXL columnist also compared the cover to that of rapper Lil Wayne's sixth studio album Tha Carter III (2008), stating that it also "reflects the reality of disenfranchised youth today."

On the song "Shark Niggas (Biters)" from his debut album Only Built 4 Cuban Linx... (1995), rapper Raekwon with Ghostface Killah criticized the cover of The Notorious B.I.G.'s Ready to Die (1994), which was released a few months after Illmatic, for featuring a picture of a baby with an afro, implying that his cover had copied the idea from Nas. This generated long-standing controversy between the rappers, resulting in an unpublicized feud which Nas later referenced in the song "Last Real Nigga Alive" from his sixth studio album God's Son (2002).

Commercial performance 
Illmatic was released on April 19, 1994, through Columbia Records in the United States. The album also featured international distribution that same year in countries including France, the Netherlands, Canada and the United Kingdom. In its first week of release, Illmatic made its debut on the Billboard 200 at number 12, selling 60,000 copies. In spite of this, initial record sales fell below expectations. The album's five radio singles failed to obtain considerable chart success. The lead single, "Halftime", only charted on the Hot Rap Singles chart at number 8, while "Life's a Bitch" did not chart at all. The album also suffered from extensive bootlegging prior to its release. "Regional demand was so high," writes music critic Jeff Weiss, "that Serch claimed he discovered a garage with 60,000 bootlegged copies." While initial sales were low, the album was eventually certified Gold in sales by the Recording Industry Association of America (RIAA) on January 17, 1996, after shipping 500,000 copies; the RIAA later certified Illmatic Platinum on December 11, 2001, following shipments in excess of a million copies. Charting together with the original Illmatic (according to the rules by Billboard), the twentieth anniversary release, Illmatic XX, sold 15,000 copies in its first week returning to Billboard 200 at number 18, with an 844% sales gain. , the album sold 1,686,000 copies in the US. In April 2002, the album was also certified gold by the Canadian Recording Industry Association for shipments in excess of 50,000 copies in Canada. The album has sold 2 million copies in the United States as of February 6, 2019.

Critical reception 

Illmatic was met with widespread acclaim from critics, many of whom hailed it as a masterpiece. NME called its music "rhythmic perfection", and Greg Kot of the Chicago Tribune cited it as the best hardcore hip hop album "out of the East Coast in years". Dimitri Ehrlich of Entertainment Weekly credited Nas for giving his neighborhood "proper respect" while establishing himself, and said that the clever lyrics and harsh beats "draw listeners into the borough's lifestyle with poetic efficiency." Touré, writing for Rolling Stone, hailed Nas as an elite rapper because of his articulation, detailed lyrics, and Rakim-like tone, all of which he said "pair [Illmatics] every beautiful moment with its harsh antithesis." Christopher John Farley of Time praised the album as a "wake-up call to [Nas'] listeners" and commended him for rendering rather than glorifying "the rough world he comes from". USA Todays James T. Jones IV cited his lyrics as "the most urgent poetry since Public Enemy" and also commended Nas for honestly depicting dismal ghetto life without resorting to the sensationalism and misogyny of contemporary gangsta rappers. Richard Harrington of The Washington Post praised Nas for "balancing limitations and possibilities, distinguishing hurdles and springboards, and acknowledging his own growth from roughneck adolescent to a maturing adult who can respect and criticize the culture of violence that surrounds him".

Some reviewers were less impressed. Heidi Siegmund of the Los Angeles Times found most of Illmatic hampered by "tired attitudes and posturing", and interpreted its acclaim from East Coast critics as "an obvious attempt to wrestle hip-hop away from the West". Charles Aaron of Spin felt that the comparisons to Rakim "will be more deserved" if Nas can expand on his ruminative lyrics with "something more personally revealing". In his initial review for Playboy, Robert Christgau called it "New York's typically spare and loquacious entry in the post-gangsta sweepstakes" and recommended it to listeners who "crave full-bore authenticity without brutal posturing".

The Source 
Upon its release, The Source gave Illmatic a five mic rating, their highest rating and a prestigious achievement at the time,  given the magazine's influence in the hip hop community. Jon Shecter, co-founder of The Source, had received a copy of the album eight months before its scheduled release, and soon lobbied for it to receive a five mic rating. On his Tumblr blog, Schecter recounts hearing Illmatic in a meeting with editors on the staff:

Eventually, the review for Illmatic was handled by the magazine's columnist Miss Info (real name Minya Oh, then writing under the pen name "shortie"), who shared Schecter's enthusiasm for Nas' album. In her review of Illmatic, Oh wrote, "I must maintain, this is one of the best hip-hop albums I have ever heard" and wrote of its content, "Lyrically, the whole shit is on point. No cliche metaphors, no gimmicks. Never too abstract, never superficial." She also commented on the impact of Nas' "poetic realism" writing: “Nas' images remind me of the personal memories and people, both past and present... All this may sound like melodrama, but it's not just me. I've been hearing similar responses all over. While 'Memory Lane' is my shit, my homies claim 'The World Is Yours,' and if you've got peoples doing time, then 'One Love' may hit you the hardest." With the backing of Schecter and the other editors on the staff, Minya awarded Illmatic with the magazine's highest rating.

Controversy 
At the time, it was unheard of for a debuting artist to receive the coveted rating. Author Matthew Gasteier writes, "It's difficult to overestimate the impact of receiving the five out of five mics, the first such rating given to any new release by the magazine since its then-editor Reginald Dennis put a moratorium on them." Reginald Dennis, former music editor of the magazine and XXL co-founder, later recounted, "Awarding records 5 mics – classic status – has always been, on some levels, troubling to me. I mean, we are not only saying that a particular piece of music is superior to everything that is out now, but it will be better than most things released in the future as well [...] I only gave one 5 under my watch and it went to Nas's Illmatic." Dennis cited it as "the only time I ever broke the 'no 5' rule" and added, "I told Jon that we'd work all of that stuff out when it was time to review the album. But everyday, Jon was like, 'yo, this album is 5 mics — seriously, Reg, 5 mics!'

The rating did not come without its share of controversy. Reginald Dennis described to the reaction that followed Minya Oh's review: "I was happy, Jon was happy, Nas was happy, everybody was happy – except for all of the people who felt that The Chronic should have also gotten a 5." Only two years prior, Dr. Dre's groundbreaking The Chronic failed to earn the coveted rating, despite redefining the musical landscape of hip hop. It was later revealed that while everybody at the magazine knew it was an instant classic, they decided to comply with the strict policy of staying away from a perfect rating. Subsequently, when Nas's album was exempted from this moratorium, many fans pointed to this decision as a confirmation of journalistic bias towards East Coast hip hop. Despite receiving criticism over his staff's earlier review of The Chronic, Reginald Dennis continues to defend the decision to award Illmatic with the magazine's highest rating: "I'm just happy that Illmatic is universally acclaimed as a classic, so no one can accuse me of dropping the ball ... And if I hadn't gone through what I did with The Chronic, I wouldn't have had the flexibility to allow for the bending of my policy. So I think it all worked out well.”

Retrospect 

Since its initial reception, Illmatic has been viewed by music writers as one of the quintessential hip hop recordings of the 1990s, while its rankings near the top of many publications' "best album" lists in disparate genres have given it a reputation as one of the greatest hip hop albums of all time. Jon Pareles of The New York Times cited Illmatic as a "milestone in trying to capture the 'street ghetto essence'". The album has been described by a number of writers and critics as "classic". Chris Ryan, writing in The New Rolling Stone Album Guide (2004), called Illmatic "a portrait of an artist as a hood, loner, tortured soul, juvenile delinquent, and fledgling social critic," and wrote that it "still stands as one of rap's crowning achievements". In a retrospective review for MSN Music, Christgau said the record was "better than I thought at the time for sure—as happens with aesthetes sometimes, the purists heard subtleties principled vulgarians like me were disinclined to enjoy", although he still found it inferior to The Notorious B.I.G.'s debut album Ready to Die (1994).  In 2002, Prefix Mags Matthew Gasteier re-examined Illmatic and its musical significance, stating:

Illmatic has been included in numerous publications' "best album" lists in disparate genres. Pitchfork listed the album at number 33 on its list of the Top 100 Albums of the 1990s, and the publication's columnist Hartley Goldstein called the album "the meticulously crafted essence of everything that makes hip-hop music great; it's practically a sonic strand of the genre's DNA." It was listed as one of 33 hip hop/R&B albums in Rolling Stones "Essential Recordings of the 90s". It was ranked number five in "The Critics Top 100 Black Music Albums of All Time" and number three in Hip Hop Connections "Top 100 Readers Poll". The album was also ranked number four in Vibes list of the Top 10 Rap Albums and number two on MTV's list of The Greatest Hip Hop Albums of All Time. In 1998, it was selected as one of The Sources 100 Best Rap Albums. In 2020, Rolling Stone ranked the album number 44 on its list of The 500 Greatest Albums of All Time. On March 30, 2004, Illmatic was remastered and re-released with a bonus disc of remixes and new material produced by Marley Marl and Large Professor, in commemoration of its tenth anniversary. Upon its 2004 re-release, Marc Hill of PopMatters dubbed it "the greatest album of all time" and stated, "Ten years after its release, Illmatic stands not only as the best hip-hop album ever made, but also one of the greatest artistic productions of the twentieth century."  The album was also included in the book 1001 Albums You Must Hear Before You Die. A February 19, 2014 Village Voice cover story ranked Illmatic as the Most New York City album ever.

Impact and legacy

East Coast hip hop 

Illmatic has been noted as one of the most influential hip hop albums of all time, with pundits describing it as an archetypal East Coast hip hop album. Jeff Weiss of Pitchfork writes: "No album better reflected the sound and style of New York, 94. The alembic of soul jazz samples, SP-1200s, broken nose breaks, and raw rap distilled the Henny, no chaser ideal of boom bap." Citing Illmatic as part of a string of notable albums released in 1994, David Drake of Stylus Magazine writes "This was the critical point for the East Coast, a time when rappers from the New York area were releasing bucketloads of thrilling work". John Bush of AllMusic compares Illmatic to another DJ Premier production, The Sun Rises in the East (1994), as "one of the quintessential East Coast records". Along with the critical acclaim of the Wu-Tang Clan's debut album Enter the Wu-Tang (36 Chambers) (1993) and the success of The Notorious B.I.G.'s debut Ready to Die (1994), Illmatic was also instrumental in restoring interest in the East Coast hip hop scene. "Rarely has the birthplace of hip-hop," wrote Rob Marriott of Complex, "been so unanimous in praise of a rap record and the MC who made it." As Nas later recounted: "It felt amazing to be accepted by New York City in that way...at the time a lot of West Coast hip-hop was selling; East Coast wasn't selling as much, especially for a new artist. So back then you couldn't tell in the sales, but you could tell in the streets".

Production 
Illmatic has been noted as a creative high point for East Coast hip hop, since it featured production from renowned New York-based producers Large Professor, Pete Rock and DJ Premier.  The album solidified the reputation of these producers, whose contributions to Illmatic became influential in shaping the soundscape of New York's regional scene. According to music writer Rob Marriott, Illmatic helped to establish DJ Premier as "the go-to producer for the jazz-and-blues-inflected knock that became so central to East Coast sound."

Following the album's release, hip hop artists increasingly began to draw upon a broad stable of producers for their projects. At the time, the assembly of big-name producers was unprecedented, since most hip hop albums had primarily been the work of one dedicated producer and sometimes an embedded production team. Yet author Adam Mansbach reflects on the impact of Illmatics noteworthy producers, writing: "The psychological impact on the listener of having all these elite producers – some of whom, like Q-Tip, really weren't known yet for doing outside production work at all – coming together to lace the debut of this kid from Queensbridge was tremendous." This same template would also be used by other successful East Coast rappers. In an article on New York hip hop, Mosi Reeves of Creative Loafing wrote that "Nas' Illmatic . . . is the first to draw together top hip hop producers in the recording industry. That formula, most successfully mined by the late Notorious B.I.G. (1997's Life After Death), Puff Daddy (1997's No Way Out) and Jay-Z (1998's Vol. 2... Hard Knock Life), is what most N.Y. prospects still use today." Jon Caramanica of The New York Times writes that after Illmatics release,  “[I]t became commonplace for rappers to search around for different producers who could enhance their sound."

Yet while hip-hop artists continue to draw upon this template for album production, the practice has earned some criticism. In an article titled, "How Nas' "Illmatic" Ruined Hip-Hop," Insanul Ahmed of Complex argues that one "unintended consequence" of Illmatic was the overall decline in the cohesion and quality of rap albums: "Next thing you knew, rap albums started having a different producer for every song. And like a film that has a different director for every scene, albums became unfocused affairs. This also meant that producers weren't tied to artists anymore."

 Queensbridge 

Illmatic is also credited with reviving the Queensbridge rap scene. Once home to prestigious pioneers such as Marley Marl, MC Shan, Roxanne Shanté, Queensbridge had been one of the most productive hip hop scenes in the country during the 1980s. In an April 2006 article, an XXL columnist wrote of the history and impact of the Queensbridge hip hop scene, stating "Since the 1980s, New York City's Queensbridge Housing Projects has been documented perhaps better than any other geographic location. Starting with super producer Marley Marl's dominant Juice Crew in the '80s all the way through '90s mainstays like Nas, Cormega and Capone, the Bridge has produced the highest per-capita talent of any 'hood." Yet during the early 1990s, the Queensbridge rap scene was otherwise stagnant. According to Nas: "I was coming from the legacy of Marley Marl, MC Shan, Juice Crew kind of vibe. Knowing these guys out in the neighborhood. At that time, the Queensbridge scene was dead. Dropping that album right there said a lot for me to carry on the legacy of the Queensbridge pioneers."

Following Illmatic'''s release, Queensbridge returned to prominence after years of obscurity, with the ascendancy of the influential hardcore rap group Mobb Deep (whose affiliation with Nas garned them credibility) and later with the emergence of the trend-setting underground duo Capone-n-Noreaga. Nas appeared on Mobb Deep's critically acclaimed studio album The Infamous (1995), in addition to their next two studio albums, Hell on Earth (1996) and Murda Muzik (1999). The album is alsocredited with launching the career of the East New York-based rapper AZ, who later joined Nas's rap group The Firm. AZ, who gained instant exposure and underground credibility due to his appearance on "Life's a Bitch", became a frequent collaborator of Nas, who appeared on his debut album Doe or Die (1995).

 Decline of alternative hip hop Illmatic was one of the first major recordings to emerge from New York's burgeoning hardcore hip hop scene, at a time when much of East Coast hip hop was still dominated by alternative hip hop acts such as A Tribe Called Quest and De La Soul (groups known for their jazz-inspired production, socially conscious lyrics, and playful sensibilities). Adam Heimlich of The New York Press comments on the appeal of alternative hip-hop in New York City's music scene, and points out that, "In 1994, there appeared likely to be more money (and definitely more cultural rewards) in working with Arrested Development or Digable Planets." Yet according to Heimlich, Illmatic provided an "explosive, explicit rejection of the cultural assimilation of most previous hip-hop," due to its rugged use of language and its uncompromising portrayal of crime. Professor Sohail Dalautzai of the University of Southern California comments on Illmatics indebtedness to hardcore hip hop: “[B]ecause in bridging the gap and embodying the street swagger of Kool G Rap, the metaphysics of Rakim, and the revolutionary lumpen philosophies of Ice Cube, Nas ... unified the disparate threads of urban rebellion that were conflagrating from hip-hop's street corner ciphers.”

Heimlich cites Nas' role in the resurgent hardcore movement, writing: "[Nas] came on the scene as hardcore's golden child. Along with Wu-Tang Clan, Nas and Mobb Deep. . . all but invented 90s New York rap, back when the notion of an 'East Coast gangsta' still meant Schoolly D or Kool G. Rap. Those three ... designed the manner and style in which New York artists would address what Snoop and Dre had made rap's hottest topics: drugs and violence." Similarly, Duke University Professor, Mark Anthony Neal, writes, "Nas was at the forefront of a renaissance of East Coast hip hop" in which "... a distinct East Coast style of so-called gangsta rap appeared," as heard in similarly styled recordings such as Wu-Tang Clan's “C.R.E.A.M.” and Notorious B.I.G.'s "Everyday Struggle". Steve Huey of AllMusic concludes that while Illmatic contains strong elements of jazz rap, it nonetheless signaled a major regional shift towards hardcore aesthetics, marking "the beginning of a shift away from Native Tongues-inspired alternative rap."

 West Coast hip hop 
The critical acclaim surrounding the album also helped to shift attention away from the melodious, synth-driven, and funk-induced G-funk subgenre, which dominated the charts for some time after Dr. Dre's The Chronic (1992). Citing the example of Snoop Dogg's wildly popular Doggystyle (released six months prior to Nas' debut) author Matthew Gasteier writes, "The first thing immediately noticeable about the [Source magazine] review, is that, like essentially every other review about Illmatic in publications like Vibe, Spin, Rolling Stones, and The New York Times, it mentions Snoop Doggy Dogg's Doggystyle in the first paragraph." That nearly every reviewer felt the need to contextualize their response to Illmatic within the frame of West Coast G-Funk "is a reminder of just how pervasive the style was within the hip hop world and the music community as a whole."

Yet according to writer Mickey Hess, Illmatic was among those East Coast records that helped "create sparse, rough and rugged soundscapes that clearly differed from Dre's multi-layered melodies." As AllMusic's Steve Huey writes, "It helped spearhead the artistic renaissance of New York hip hop in the post-Chronic era, leading a return to street aesthetics." Contrasting these aesthetics with the themes found in G-Funk, writer and filmmaker Dream Hampton writes, "Illmatic was a dirty bomb thrown at the orchestral sonic soundtrack that was The Chronic... This wasn't a backyard bikini barbeque where the Ohio Players and DJ Quik were mashed up; this was a three-month bid on Rikers Island, a dirty dice game, blunts of brown Brooklyn sparked in the park after dark."

Despite these regional differences, Hampton credits Illmatic with providing a long-term artistic common ground for rappers on the West Coast and East Coast rap scenes. In the 2009 essay "Born Alone, Die Alone," she recounts the album's impact on West Coast artist, Tupac Shakur. While working as a journalist for The Source in 1994, Hampton covered three court cases involving Tupac. Around this time, she received an advance-copy of Illmatic and immediately dubbed a cassette version for Tupac, who became "an instant convert" of the album. The next day, she writes, Tupac "arrived in his assigned courtroom blasting Illmatic so loudly that the bailiff yelled at him to turn it off before the judge took his seat on the bench." In her essay, Hampton implies that Nas' lyricism might have influenced Tupac's acclaimed album Me Against the World, which was recorded that same year.

West Coast artist The Game also recounts the impact of Illmatic for fans like himself outside of New York. In his collaboration with Nas on "Hustlers" (2006), he retells an episode taking place during his youth, where he decided to shoplift both Illmatic and The Chronic: "1995, eleven years from the day/I'm in the record shop with choices to make Illmatic on the top shelf, The Chronic on the left, homie/Wanna cop both but only got a twenty on me/So fuck it, I stole both, spent the twenty on a dub-sack/Ripped the package of Illmatic and bumped that/For my niggas it was too complex when Nas rhymed/I was the only Compton nigga with a New York State of Mind". 

 Lyricism 
During the time of its release, Illmatic brought a renewed focus on lyricism to hip hop—hearkening back to the heyday of Kool G Rap, Big Daddy Kane, and Rakim. Music journalist Kelefa Sanneh of The New York Times wrote of Illmatic, stating that Nas "perfected a dense, rat-a-tat rhyme style that built upon the legacy of 1980s pioneers like Rakim and Big Daddy Kane." In his book To the Break of Dawn: A Freestyle on the Hip Hop Aesthetic, William Jelani Cobb writes of Nas' impact on lyricism and the comparisons to eminent rapper Rakim at the time: 

Despite its initial low sales, the album had a profound impact on the hip hop underground circuit, and marked a major stylistic change in hip hop music by introducing a new standard of lyricism. Before the album's release, hip-hop lyricism was mostly defined by two popular forms. One was characterized by a fast-paced ragga-flow accompanied with a whimsical, often nonsensical lyrical delivery, and had been popularized by the Brooklyn-based groups Das EFX and The Fu-Schnickens. The other was characterized by a slurred "lazy drawl" that generally sacrificed lyrical complexity for clarity and rhythmic cadence, and was exemplified by West Coast hip hop emcees including Snoop Doggy Dogg and Warren G. However, Nas' content, verbal pace, and intricate internal rhyme patterns inspired several rappers to modify their lyrical abilities.  Music critic Rob Marriott notes, "[R]appers like Mobb Deep, Tragedy Khadafi, Nature, Cormega, Noreaga, Capone, Raekwon, Ghostface, and even the Windy City wordsmith Common seemed to find new inspiration in Nas' self awareness, internal rhyme schemes, and mastery of street detail." Marriott also describes the impact of Illmatics "poetic approach" on Jay-Z, writing: "The Brooklyn MC switched his style up from his fast-talking Jaz-O days enough to produce Reasonable Doubt, an album marked by Nas-like introspection..."

Many rappers have taken note of Illmatic's influence on their lyricism. Ghostface Killah recounted, “When I used to listen to Nas back in the days, it was like, 'Oh shit! He murdered that.' That forced me to get my pen game up ... The whole Illmatic album forced you to go ahead and do shit ... It was inspiration." Detroit rapper Elzhi states, "[A]round the time Nas did Illmatic, it made me wanna step my game up ... He's one of the reasons I did go off into storytelling because his pictures were so vivid. When he displayed his rhyme schemes and his word play and his songs, it made me wanna create visual pictures as well." Casey Veggies also recounts the impact Nas' lyricism had on his own work as an underground rapper in the 2000s: “I [got into] Illmatic when I was 14, 15. I didn't get onto to it till late, but when I did, that's probably the only thing I listened to for six months to a year ... After I got heavy on Illmatic, I put out Sleeping In Class (2010). That's when I really tried to sharpen my skills and get better.”

 Hip hop poetry 
In addition to his rapping, Nas achieved significance for his poetic use of language. Professor Adilifu Nama of California State University Northridge writes, “With Illmatic, hip-hop witnessed the birth of an urban griot telling hard-boiled tales of ghetto alienation and triumph like a spoken-word of a Chester Himes novel". Author and music writer Todd Boyd wrote of Nas' urban realism, stating that his "poetic lyrics are some of the most poignant words ever to describe the postindustrial urban experience. His spoken-word like delivery and his vivid use of metaphor placed him at the top of the game in terms of overall skills as an MC and as a cultural commentator." An OhWord.com columnist similarly described Nas as a "genius introvert who rose out of the rubble of Reaganomics to bless the mic with a forward brand of introspective, redemptive street poetry". Princeton University professor Imani Perry also describes Illmatic as ars poetica, a definitive statement for the art of hip-hop poetry."

According to author and poet Kevin Coval, Nas “raise[d] the bar for MCs” by advancing his lyricism “from punch lines and hot lines to whole thought pictures manifest in rhyme form.” Together with Paul Beatty's seminal collection of poems, Joker Joker Deuce (1994) Coval cites the release of Illmatic as a "generational moment" that marked the development of hip hop poetry. Just as hip-hop poetics were being written and published for the first time on paper, Nas provided a sonic production that definitively captured "the poetic response" to hip hop music. “It is from this point on,” he writes, “that style, technique and craft merge with collage/pastiche, braggadocio, stark portrait-painting from the margins, frenetic, fun and funny wordplay, and the rupture of linear storytelling schemes. These become tropes in a burgeoning school of American letters that's moving toward an aesthetics of hip-hop poetics."

Many of the poetic tropes found in Illmatic have also become terms and phrases within hip-hop lexicon. "'The World Is Yours,' Nas' reference to the blimp in Scarface," writes Rob Marriott, "has remained a trope hip-hop has taken to heart ... Even the word "Illmatic" itself [...] became synonymous with anything surprisingly excellent, street-born and/or out of left field." In 2013, music writer Jeff Weiss commented on the extensive vernacular usage of Illmatic, writing: "The phrases and images are so deeply rooted in rap consciousness to have become cliché. Over the last 19 years, a million secret handshakes and scratched hooks have been executed to lines from Illmatic."

 Hip hop artists 
Respected mainstream and underground rappers have acknowledged Illmatics influence. These wide range of artists include the battle rappers, SunN.Y. and Reef The Lost Cauze, conscious rappers Talib Kweli and Lupe Fiasco, the producers Just Blaze and 9th Wonder, as well as the platinum-selling artists Wiz Khalifa, Alicia Keys and The Game, who makes references to the album on his debut, The Documentary In 2006, Illmatic was featured in a list of acclaimed hip hop albums, compiled by Clipse. Malice, a member of the hip hop duo, claimed: "Illmatic captured the whole New York state of mind for me. It embraced everything I knew New York to be. The album had 10 songs, all of them flawless. Me and my homies got great memories of rolling around listening to that, huslin', smokin', chillin'. That embodied everything that was right with hip-hop. That CD never came out my deck." Speaking in 2012, British producer, DJ Semtex described Illmatic as "an exemplary album of perfection that forced the evolution of lyricism and production values within hip hop. Eighteen years later it remains omnipotent."

In 2006, Marc Mac of the electronic music duo 4hero, produced a cover version of "The World Is Yours" as part of his jazz and hip-hip fusion project, The Visioneers. Lyrics from Illmatic have been sampled by other rappers, notably Big L's "Ebonics" (which samples "It Ain't Hard to Tell"), Milkbone's "Keep It Real" ("Life's a Bitch"), Real Live's "Real Live Shit" ("It Ain't Hard to Tell"), Damu the Fudgemunk's "Prosper" ft. Raw Poetic ("N.Y. State of Mind"), Blu & Exile's "In Remembrance" ("The World Is Yours" and "One Love"), Mac Miller's "Nikes On My Feet" ("The World Is Yours") and Jay-Z's "Rap Game/Crack Game" ("Represent") and "Dead Presidents II" ("The World Is Yours").

 Legacy and tributes Illmatic has become a benchmark for upcoming rappers whose albums are widely anticipated by critics. Hip hop pundits have viewed debut albums as crucial in generating publicity and shaping the legacy of an artist's career. Given the historic anticipation and acclaim surrounding Nas' debut, Illmatic has become a byword for this sort of phenomenon. As one columnist for the Complex Magazine writes, "Think about the question that pops into your head whenever a new rapper drops his first album: 'Is it the next Illmatic?'" In 2012, the release of Kendrick Lamar's album, Good Kid, M.A.A.D City, drew comparisons to Illmatic from critics and journalists.Murray, Keith IS KENDRICK LAMAR'S 'GOOD KID, M.A.A.D CITY' THE MOST IMPORTANT DEBUT SINCE 'ILLMATIC'? Retrieved March 8, 2013 In an interview with 2 Dope Boyz, Lamar commented on these comparisons, stating: {{blockquote| “Illmatic? For people to even put my album in the light of that, is an accomplishment. It's crazy to even be mentioned with it but it's scary at the same time ... That era – I wanna say the age range now would be 30, 30 to 40 – they can recognize this was the album. Illmatics the album for the '90s era when I was growing up ... it's just a weird feeling to be in that same type of light, 'cus it takes a whole lot of responsibility to keep that up in the long run and longevity, and that's something I don't have yet…so Illmatic will always be #1.” }}

Illmatic has also been cited as a musical template for other hip hop artists. Common's critically acclaimed album Be (2005) has been said to have been molded after Illmatic.Diaz, Ruben. 5 Minutes With Common. BallerStatus. Retrieved on January 20, 2007. In 2010, underground hip hop artist Fashawn released the mixtape Ode to Illmatic to "pay homage, 'cause Illmatic was one of them kinda albums that really impacted my life”. Detroit rapper Elzhi released a remake of Illmatic titled Elmatic (2011). Taking note of a trend of tributes to Illmatic in 2011, Richard Watson of The Guardian wrote, "To quote Nasir Jones himself...'It Ain't Hard To Tell' why today's rappers are paying tribute to his debut album. Illmatic has become a totem, a work that both looked back into hip-hop history and pointed towards its future. "

 Intellectual response 
Illmatic has also received notable attention from scholars and authors outside the music industry. Since its release, the album has become
the subject of scholarship within academic and literary circles. In 2009, as part of the 33⅓ book series, author Matthew Gasteier published a deconstruction of Illmatic, that focuses on the dualities that inform its narratives. In 2012, playwright Shaun Neblett created a tribute play titled Homage 3: Illmatic, which tells the story of an aspiring artist and explores the themes found in Nas' debut. "[A]s its title suggests," writes one reviewer, "...the play is completely based on and acts as a tribute to Nas' Illmatic album. The rappers' bars come alive on stage through Homage 3, which deliberately shows how intellectually well-versed Nas truly is, and much bigger than that, how much Hip-Hop has to offer, culturally, outside of the radio, clubs and the street."

Illmatic is also the focus of a significant work of hip-hop scholarship, Born to Use Mics: Reading Nas's Illmatic (2009), edited by Michael Eric Dyson and Sohail Daulatzai. With contributions from figures such as Greg Tate, Adam Mansbach, Eddie Glaude, Dream Hampton, Marc Lamont Hill, and Suheir Hammad, Born to Use Mics... is the first academic project to assemble a group of scholars, poets, filmmakers, journalists, novelists, and musicians to reflect on a specific hip hop album. In the introduction, Daulatzai explains the singular focus on Illmatic, writing:

 Hip hop debates 
Illmatic has also helped to shape the attitudes and perceptions of hip hop fans, who cherish it as a music template that defines the genre's conventions. As music critic Jeff Weiss writes,  “Illmatic is the gold standard that boom-bap connoisseurs refer to in the same way that Baby Boomers talk about Highway 61 Revisited. The evidence they point to when they want to say: this is how good it can be.” New York Times columnist Jon Caramanica also credits the album with inadvertently spawning hip hop's counterculture. "Illmatic" he writes, "mobilized a national network of dissidents craving something true to the streets but eager to distance themselves from what was beginning to be perceived as a scourge – gangster rap." According to Caramanica, Nas' debut was received by these fans as a "rebuke" towards trends that were beginning to shape mainstream rap: "the pop crossover, the exuberant production values, [and] the splintering of rap into blithe and concerned wings."

For this reason, Caramanica considers Illmatic to be "unusually significant to the intellectual development of the [hip-hop] genre" yet he also remains critical of the divisiveness spawned by its "zealots." In his essay, "'Night Time is More Trife Than Ever': The Many Misuses of Nas," he writes: "Illmatic is responsible for countless pointless 'rap versus hip-hop debates,' a shocking amount of hip-hop self-righteousness, the emergence of the backpack movement as something more than a regional curio, and the persistence of the idea that lyricism is the only standard great rap music should be held to." Commenting on these polarized debates, Jeff Weiss suggests that Illmatic is "best heard by ignoring the dogma, culture wars, Nas clones, and would-be saviors that have accreted since April of 1994. Who cares whether it's the greatest rap album of all-time or not? It's an example of how great rap can be, but not necessarily the way it should be."'

 Subsequent work by Nas 

While its success helped Nas' career immeasurably, hip hop aficionados have cited the album as his inextricable "gift and curse". Due to its critical fame, Nas' subsequent studio albums have been weighed against Illmatic, despite all of them outselling his debut. Against this standard, they are often critically deemed as mediocre follow-ups. After manager Steve Stoute convinced Nas to aim his efforts in a more commercial direction for his follow-up album It Was Written (1996), he enlisted the production team Trackmasters, who were known for their mainstream work at the time. It was criticized for its embrace of gangsta/mafioso themes and materialistic subject matter, but proved to be a commercial success, selling over three million copies. Critics gave it mixed reviews, and general consensus was that it failed to live up to the classic status of Illmatic. Many fans of Illmatic labeled his subsequent efforts as 'selling out', due to his crossover sensibilities (e.g. his participation with the hip hop group The Firm) and radio-friendly hits aimed at the pop charts, such as "If I Ruled the World (Imagine That)" (1996) and "Hate Me Now" (1999).

When he released his third and fourth studio albums, I Am… and Nastradamus (1999), which underwent editing due to bootlegging of the recording sessions, many fans and critics feared that his career was deteriorating, as both albums received further criticism for their commercially oriented sound. Reflecting this widespread perception in the hip hop community and adding to his ongoing feud with Nas at the time, Jay-Z mocked him in the song "Takeover" (2001) for having a "one hot album [Illmatic] every ten year average". A journalist writing for The Source commented on the demanding legacy of Nas' debut: "Blame excellence, blame perfection and aggression. Blame one of hip-hop's most beautiful moments for the prison that traps Nasir Jones today – blame Illmatic." Nas, however, made something of a comeback with his fifth album Stillmatic (2001) and the acclaimed follow-up God's Son (2002), as well as The Lost Tapes (2002), a compilation of previously unreleased tracks from the I Am… and Nastradamus sessions. Afterwards, his subsequent albums have all been well received by critics. Nevertheless, most fans have regarded Illmatic as his definitive album.

In 2011, Nas performed the album in its entirety at Rock the Bells music festival. The show featured the album's personnel, including Pete Rock, DJ Premier, and AZ, and a stage design depicting the urban landscape of Queensbridge, with graffiti-lined streets, a subway entrance, and models of Queensbridge's housing project. In 2012, he also performed the album in its entirety at South by Southwest music festival, with the same personnel and stage design. Illmatic will be reissued as a deluxe CD bundled with a 48-page hardcover book featuring photos, reproduced artwork, lyrics, and liner notes courtesy of The Source founder Jon Schecter.

In 2014, Nas announced Illmatic XX, the 20th Anniversary Edition of the original album Illmatic, released April 15, 4 days prior to the 20th Anniversary of the original's release date (April 19). Illmatic XX includes a remastered version of Illmatic, an extra disc of demos, remixes, and unreleased records from that era of Nas' career. He also announced his plans for a tour where he will perform the whole album front to back on each stop.

 20th anniversary 
In 2014, Illmatic turned 20. Myspace commissioned authors and musicians alike to create 10 fictional short stories inspired by the album. Musician Mack Wilds is the first perspective by creating his take on "The Genesis".

Then writers like Shea Serrano, Rob Marriot, Justin Charity and others finished the table of contents. The book opens hailing Illmatic for its contributions in the hip-hop genre and having the staying power to last twenty years. Illmatic is known as one of the most refined rap albums, these stories just add to the narrative.

 Track listing 

 Sample credits The Genesis"Live at the Barbeque" by Main Source
Dialogue from the 1983 film Wild StyleN.Y. State of Mind"Mind Rain" by Joe Chambers
"N.T." by Kool & the Gang
"Flight Time" by Donald Byrd
"Mahogany" by Eric B. & Rakim
"Live at the Barbeque" by Main SourceLife's a Bitch"Yearning for Your Love" by The Gap BandThe World Is Yours"I Love Music" by Ahmad Jamal
"Dance Girl" by The Rimshots
"Walter L" by Jimmy Gordon & His Jazznpops Band
"It's Yours" by T La RockHalftime"Dead End" by Japanese Hair Cast
"School Boy Crush" by Average White Band
"Soul Travelin' Pt. 1" by Gary ByrdMemory Lane (Sittin' in da Park)"We're in Love" by Reuben Wilson
"Get Out of My Life, Woman" by Allen Touissant 
"Pickin' Boogers" by Biz Markie
"Droppin' Science" by Marley Marl and Craig GOne Love"Smilin' Billy Suite, Pt. II" by The Heath Brothers
"Come in Out of the Rain" by Parliament
"One Love" by WhodiniOne Time 4 Your Mind"Walter L" by Jimmy Gordon & His Jazznpops BandRepresent"The Thief of Bagdad" by Lee Erwin
"I Didn't Come Rhythm" by George ClintonIt Ain't Hard to Tell'"Human Nature" by Michael Jackson
"Slow Dance" by Stanley Clarke
"Long Red (Live)" by Mountain
"N.T." by Kool & the Gang

 Personnel 

 Nas – lead vocals, co-producer
 AZ – co-vocals (3)
 Olu Dara – trumpet
 Q-Tip – vocals, producer
 Pete Rock – vocals, producer
 DJ Premier – producer
 Diego Garrido – engineer, mixing
 Jack Hersca – assistant engineer
 Large Professor – producer
 Tim "The Funky Red" Latham – engineer
 L.E.S. – producer
 Faith N. – executive producer, producer

 MC Serch – executive producer
 Anton "Sample This" Pushansky – engineer
 Kevin Reynolds – engineer
 Eddie Sancho – engineer
 Jamey Staub – engineer
 Louis Tineo – assistant engineer
 Jason Vogel – engineer
 Stan Wallace – engineer
 Aimee Macauley – art director
 Danny Clinch – photography
 Tony Dawsey – mastering engineer

 Charts 

 Weekly charts 

 Year-end charts 

 Certifications 

 Accolades 
The information regarding accolades attributed to Illmatic is adapted from Acclaimed Music.

 See also 
 Album era
 Nas: Time Is Illmatic References 
184. ^ “500 Greatest Albums of All Time” Rolling Stone. September 22, 2020 Retrieved November 13, 2020

 Bibliography 
 
 
 
 
 Cobb, William Jelani (2006). To the Break of Dawn: A Freestyle on the Hip Hop Aesthetic''. New York University Press. .

External links 
 
 

1994 debut albums
Nas albums
Columbia Records albums
Albums produced by DJ Premier
Albums produced by Pete Rock
Albums produced by L.E.S. (record producer)
Albums produced by Large Professor
Albums produced by Marley Marl
Albums produced by Q-Tip (musician)
Albums recorded at Chung King Studios
United States National Recording Registry recordings
United States National Recording Registry albums
Albums recorded at WKCR-FM